Mwambani is a settlement in Kenya's Eastern Province.

Namesake 

There is also a Mwambani Bay on the Indian Ocean coast south of Tanga.

References 

Populated places in Eastern Province (Kenya)